Henriette Poincaré (born Henriette Adeline Benucci, lived 1858–1943) was the wife of French statesman Raymond Poincaré. She was born in Passy, France. Her parents were a coachman of Italian origin, Raphael Benucci, and Louise Mossbauer, a young servant. She served for a time as a companion to old ladies of the bourgeoisie.

She was married twice before her marriage to Raymond Poincaré. Her first marriage ended in divorce in 1890; her second marriage ended with her husband's death in 1892. She married Raymond in a civil ceremony in Paris on 17 August 1904. The marriage was secretly solemnized religiously on 5 May 1913, a few months after Raymond was elected to the presidency of France, in their apartment at 10 Rue de Babylone (7th arrondissement of Paris) by the rector of the Catholic Institute of Paris, Mgr. Baudrillart, who had been a high school friend of Raymond's. When this secret leaked out, it gave the Radicals a way to criticize Raymond. The press also insulted Henriette for her love life.

In 1917, she was surprised in the garden of the Élysée Palace by an orangutan escaped from a circus that was then held at the nearby Rond-Point theater (or possibly, as another version of the incident has it, a chimpanzee escaped from his master's house, his master being a diplomat lodged near the palace).

References

1858 births
1943 deaths
Spouses of French presidents
Spouses of prime ministers of France